This is a list of singles that reached number one on the Swiss Hitparade during the 1980s.

Number-one singles

See also
1980s in music

References

Number-one singles
Switzerland
1980s